The Circle Theatre on the 1900 block of Pennsylvania Avenue, NW, in Washington, D.C. was designed by Albert B. Mullett & Co. and opened in March 1910. It had previously been a store in a three story Federal style building.

Believed to be the District’s first continuously operating movie theatre, it was the first to feature repertory films.

History
The Circle was renovated and enlarged in 1935 in the Art Deco style.  In the 1970s and 1980s, it was a repertory movie theatre.  From 1968 to 1986, the Inner Circle Theater ran first and second run films. The theatre closed in September 1986 and were demolished.    Brothers Ted and Jim Pedas owned the theatre since 1957.

References

Theatres in Washington, D.C.
1910 establishments in Washington, D.C.
1986 disestablishments in Washington, D.C.
Cinemas and movie theaters in Washington, D.C.
Art Deco architecture in Washington, D.C.
Foggy Bottom
Former cinemas in the United States